"Redondo Beach" is a song by Patti Smith. It was first released on Smith's 1975 album Horses, with band members Richard Sohl and Lenny Kaye credited as co-writers. The lyrics were originally published as a poem in Smith's 1972 book kodak under the title "Radando Beach".

Song
The lyrics relate the suicide by drowning of a young woman following an argument with the song's narrator. It has frequently been interpreted as a lesbian-themed song; Smith appeared to encourage this interpretation in her live performances, often introducing the song with "Redondo Beach is a beach where women love other women".

She later said that she wrote the lyrics in 1971 following a fight with her sister Linda; Linda had disappeared for the day, causing Patti to worry that she had come to harm. Smith also stated that she considers herself "beyond gender" in her artistic expression. Smith's lyrics were set to a reggae arrangement.

Morrissey version

The song was part of Morrissey's live set list throughout his December 2004 Arena Tour. "Redondo Beach / There Is a Light That Never Goes Out" was a double A-side single released by Morrissey to promote his live album Live at Earls Court in 2005. The double A-side reached number 11 in the United Kingdom, and "Redondo Beach" reached number 33 in Sweden.

Track listings
7" vinyl
 "Redondo Beach" (live) (Patti Smith, Richard Sohl, Lenny Kaye) – 4:07
 "There Is a Light That Never Goes Out" (live) (Johnny Marr, Morrissey) – 4:50

CD single
 "There Is a Light That Never Goes Out" (live) (Johnny Marr, Morrissey) - 4:50
 "Redondo Beach" (live) (Patti Smith, Richard Sohl, Lenny Kaye) – 4:07
 "Noise Is the Best Revenge" (Janice Long session 2004) (Morrissey, Boz Boorer) - 4:03

DVD single
 "Redondo Beach" (live) (Patti Smith, Richard Sohl, Lenny Kaye) – 4:07
 "There Is a Light That Never Goes Out" (live) (Johnny Marr, Morrissey) – 4:50
 "It's Hard to Walk Tall When You're Small" (Janice Long session 2004) (Morrissey, Alain Whyte)
 "There Is a Light That Never Goes Out" (live promotional video)
 "There Is a Light That Never Goes Out" (video taken from Manchester Evening News Arena)

Charts

Release history

Other cover versions
The song was performed by Angel Corpus Christi on I Love NY, her 1984 album of cover versions that were originally recorded by New York-based artists.

References

External links
 
 

1975 songs
2005 singles
Patti Smith songs
Morrissey songs
Songs about beaches
Songs about suicide
Songs written by Patti Smith
Songs about Los Angeles
Lesbian-related songs
Redondo Beach, California
Songs written by Lenny Kaye
Songs written by Richard Sohl
Song recordings produced by Peter Asher
Song recordings produced by John Cale
UK Independent Singles Chart number-one singles